Sphenomorphus rarus is a species of skink found in Panama.

References

rarus
Reptiles described in 1991
Reptiles of Panama